The 2014–15 Wright State Raiders men's basketball team represented Wright State University during the 2014–15 NCAA Division I men's basketball season. The Raiders, led by fifth year head coach Billy Donlon, played their home games at the Nutter Center and were members of the Horizon League. They finished the season 11–20, 3–13 in Horizon League play to finish in eighth place. They lost in the first round of the Horizon League tournament to UIC.

Roster

Schedule

|-
! colspan="9" style="background:#355e3b; color:gold;"| Exhibition

|-
! colspan="9" style="background:#355e3b; color:gold;"| Regular season

|-
! colspan="9" style="background:#355e3b; color:gold;"|Horizon League tournament

References

Wright State Raiders men's basketball seasons
Wright State
2014 in sports in Ohio
2015 in sports in Ohio